Harold Jay "Hal" Bedsole (December 21, 1941 – December 22, 2017) was an American football player.  He played as a tight end and end early in his career during the single platoon days.

High school career
Bedsole prepped at Reseda High School, graduated in 1959.

College career
Bedsole played college football for the University of Southern California (USC).  He helped lead the USC Trojans to a national championship in 1962 under coach John McKay. Bedsole was a two-time First-team All AAWU Conference (now known as the Pac-12 Conference) selection and the first Trojan to have 200 receiving yards in a single game. He was inducted into the USC Athletics Hall of Fame in 2001 and into the College Football Hall of Fame in 2012. He transferred to USC from Pierce College.

Professional career
Bedsole played for the Minnesota Vikings of the National Football League (NFL) between 1964 and 1966. After his football career ended, due to knee injuries he worked in sales and marketing at KNX-FM, a ground breaking soft rock radio station in Los Angeles.

References

External links
 
 
 

1941 births
2017 deaths
American football ends
American football tight ends
Minnesota Vikings players
Pierce Brahmas football players
USC Trojans football players
All-American college football players
College Football Hall of Fame inductees
Players of American football from Los Angeles
Players of American football from Chicago